Hacksaw is a 2020 found footage horror slasher film written and directed by Anthony Leone in his feature film debut. The film stars Amy Cay, Brian Patrick Butler, Cortney Palm, and Sadie Katz.

Plot 
A traveling young couple on a road trip venture into an abandoned building where a serial killer once tortured their victims.

Cast 

 Amy Cay as Ashley
 Brian Patrick Butler as Tommy
 Cortney Palm as Teryn
 Sadie Katz as DJ Cassidy
 George Jac as Reporter Max
 Jayce Venditti as Richard

Production 

The feature film directorial debut for Leone, who was also cinematographer, editor, writer and producer. Leone gave thanks credit to Tobe Hooper and Dennis Hopper, noting influence of the film came from The Texas Chainsaw Massacre and Easy Rider. The film was shot in San Diego with only practical effects and most of the time, a three person crew.

Release 

Hacksaw premiered on February 15, 2020, at Monsters of Horror International Film Festival. It was distributed on video on demand by Midnight Releasing on January 5, 2021.

Reception 
The film won Best Slasher Film at Monsters of Horror International Film Festival.

Critical Response

Midnight Horror Show scored it 3 out of 5 claiming the runtime was too short, though the plot was interesting. Michael Therkelsen at Horror Society gave it a 6 out of 10, stating that the "special effects and scenes of torture" save the movie. AJ Friar at Infamous Horrors gave it 3 out of 5 stating that it is a unique film but the script could be tighter. Dante Yurei of 10th Circle scored it 4 out of 10, claiming it will get the "attention of gorehounds." David Garrett at Dark Discussions said most of the story was boring and needed more development scoring it 3.5 out of 10. Bloodbath and Beyond gave the film 1 out of 5. Jim Morazzini at Voices From The Balcony scored it a 1 out of 5 calling it a "torture porn" splatter film and that "feels like a bad attempt at a Rob Zombie film." Andrew Welsh scored it an F, claiming "you won’t find any low budget, indie horror movie charm here." FilmTv said it had disastrous direction which simulates the terrible mockumentary.

References

External links 

 
 
 

2020 horror films
American horror films
Found footage films
American splatter films
2020s slasher films
American slasher films
Crime horror films
2020s serial killer films
American serial killer films
American road movies
2020s road movies
Torture in films
Films about violence against women
Films set in abandoned buildings and structures
Mumblecore films
American independent films
2020 independent films
2020 directorial debut films
Splatterpunk
Camcorder films
2020s mockumentary films
Films about snuff films
Films about couples
Films about murder
Works about fictional serial killers
Films set in San Diego
Films shot in San Diego